Below is a list of notable people born in Resen Municipality in North Macedonia:

 Lambe Alabakoski, singer
 Meto Jovanovski, writer
 Trayko Kitanchev, revolutionary
 Andrey Lyapchev, former Bulgarian Prime Minister
 George Nanchoff, football striker
 Louis Nanchoff, football striker
 Ahmed Niyazi Bey, member of the Young Turks
 Simeon Radev, diplomat and writer, author of Builders of Modern Bulgaria
 Hristo Tatarchev, leader of the revolutionary movement in Macedonia and Eastern Thrace
 Lui Temelkovski, former Liberal Party of Canada Member of Parliament for the Ontario riding of Oak Ridges—Markham

Resen
Resen

bg:Ресен#Личности